Kang Kalan is a village in Shahkot in Jalandhar district of Punjab State, India. The village is administrated by a sarpanch who is an elected representative of village as per Panchayati raj (India).

Transport 
Shahkot Malisian station is the nearest train station.

Partition 
Before partition of Indo-Pak, mainly arain families were living in this village, who mostly migrated to Faisalabad- Pakistan. A very notable family of "Baba Shah Deen & Baba Umer Deen" lived their lives in Chak No. 80 JB (Nanak Sar) https://goo.gl/maps/2AfFjmrDCsxu2QMk9] Faisalabad. Their family is still known in the area with the name of "Kangan Walai".

References 
https://goo.gl/maps/2AfFjmrDCsxu2QMk9

Villages in Jalandhar district